Heyford may refer to:

Places
 Lower Heyford, Oxfordshire, England
 Heyford railway station, serving Lower Heyford
 Nether Heyford, Northamptonshire, England
 Upper Heyford, Northamptonshire, England
 Upper Heyford, Oxfordshire, England

Other
 Handley Page Heyford, a bomber aircraft